Tramps Like Us can refer to:

 Tramps Like Us, a Japanese manga series
 Tramps Like Us (album), a 2004 album by Kacy Crowley
 Tramps Like Us (memoir), a memoir by screenwriter and author Kristen Buckley
 "Tramps Like Us", a series 3 episode of The IT Crowd